Idde Schultz is a 1995 studio album by Idde Schultz and her debut album as a solo artist.

Track listing
Lyrics and music by Idde Schultz except where noted.

I min famn 
(Du var) allt jag ville ha (Olle Ljungström/Andreas Mattsson)
Farväl - Adjö (Idde Schultz/Staffan Hellstrand)
Fiskarna i haven
Småstadsskvaller (Staffan Hellstrand/Fredrik Blank)
Skärsår (Schultz/Hellstrand)
Högre mark
Du såg aldrig mig
Jag väljer mina drömmar själv (Ljungström/Hellstrand/Schultz)
Vita hus och lila slätter
Den andra dagen i maj

Contributors
Idde Schultz - vocals
Staffan Hellstrand - guitar, organ, harmonica
Magnus Persson - drums, percussion, didgeridoo
Matts Alsberg - bass
Fredrik Blank - guitar
SNYKO - musicians

Charts

References 

1995 debut albums
Idde Schultz albums